Tyson Lee Griffin (born April 20, 1984) is a retired American mixed martial artist who competed in the lightweight division. He competed for the UFC, Strikeforce, the RFA, and the World Series of Fighting.

Background
Griffin was a standout wrestler at Albany High School and moved on to wrestle at Santa Rosa Junior College before dropping out. He began training at David Terrell's NorCal Fighting Alliance and the Cesar Gracie Academy. During his first mixed martial arts training session, Terrell cut two gashes over Griffin's left eye, requiring stitches. Griffin states that he committed himself to a career in MMA while in the hospital waiting room. His mother supported him during his first year of training, but after his professional debut he had to get side jobs to support himself through his early career.

Mixed martial arts career
Tyson Griffin began his professional career in 2004 in the Gladiator Challenge promotion. In his third bout, he dropped to featherweight to earn a TKO victory over future World Extreme Cagefighting featherweight champion Urijah Faber, which stood as Faber's only defeat for over three years. Griffin went on to win all of his first six fights before facing Duane Ludwig at Strikeforce: Revenge. He won the bout by TKO in the first round, attracting the attention of major promotions.  After considering offers from Pride Fighting Championship and the UFC, Griffin signed with the UFC so that he could continue to fight stateside. While cornering for David Terrel at UFC 59 in Las Vegas, Griffin had an opportunity to meet members of the Xtreme Couture camp for the first time.

Ultimate Fighting Championship
Griffin made his UFC debut at UFC 63 against David Lee. He won the bout via rear-naked choke submission in the first round, and later used the prize money to move to Las Vegas and joined the Xtreme Couture camp. Former teammate Nick Diaz criticized Griffin as a "gym jumper", but Griffin rejected the accusation. He began 2007 with a fight against Frank Edgar at UFC 67. The back-and-forth bout ended with Edgar trapped in a tight kneebar, but the judges unanimously scored the bout in his favor, handing Griffin his first professional loss. He rebounded with two decision victories over Clay Guida and Thiago Tavares at UFC 72 and UFC 76, respectively. All three of his bouts in 2007 were judged in the top 10 best of year.

In 2008, Griffin won unanimous decisions over Gleison Tibau at UFC 81 and Marcus Aurélio at UFC 86.

He next faced Sean Sherk at UFC 90, in a fight with title contention implications. In another three-round war, Griffin lost by unanimous decision, after a hard fought fight.

Griffin defeated Rafael dos Anjos at UFC Fight Night: Condit vs Kampmann via unanimous decision.

He won against Hermes Franca via KO in the second round at UFC 103, earning his first victory via stoppage in three years.

Griffin was scheduled to face Jim Miller on January 2, 2010 at UFC 108, but was forced off the card with an injury.

Griffin fought Xtreme Couture training partner Evan Dunham on June 12, 2010 at UFC 115. He lost the fight via split decision.

Griffin faced former PRIDE Lightweight Champion, Takanori Gomi on August 1, 2010 at UFC Live: Jones vs. Matyushenko, replacing an injured Joe Stevenson. Griffin lost via KO (punch) at 1:04 of the first round. This marked the first time Griffin had lost back to back fights, as well as the first time he had been stopped in a fight as all of his previous losses had gone to a decision. Griffin was visibly upset with the loss; pacing around the octagon and refusing to shake Gomi's hand.

Griffin was defeated by Nik Lentz on November 20, 2010 at UFC 123 by split decision. After the bout it was revealed that Griffin had failed a post-fight drug screening, testing positive for marijuana.

Griffin next faced Manvel Gamburyan in his featherweight debut on June 26, 2011 at UFC on Versus 4. He won the fight via majority decision.

Griffin lost to Bart Palaszewski on October 29, 2011 at UFC 137 via first-round KO. During weigh ins, Griffin had failed to make the featherweight limit, coming in 3 pounds over. Griffin was fined 25 percent of his earnings and the bout took place at a catchweight of 148 lb. It wasn't announced until June 2012 that he was released from the promotion shortly after the fight.

Resurrection Fighting Alliance
Griffin signed a 3-fight contract with the Resurrection Fighting Alliance (RFA).

Tyson faced TUF 8 winner Efrain Escudero in a lightweight bout at Resurrection Fighting Alliance 4 on November 2, 2012. He won the fight via unanimous decision.

World Series Of Fighting
In June 2013, it was announced that Griffin had signed a multi-fight deal with World Series of Fighting. On August 10, 2013, he faced Strikeforce veteran Gesias Cavalcante. He lost the fight via TKO in the third round.

Griffin faced Luiz Firmino at WSOF 10 on June 21, 2014. He lost the fight via unanimous decision.

Universal Reality Combat Championship
On August 24 2018, after a four year retirement/hiatus, Tyson Griffin returned to face former Bellator fighter, Jordan Bailey at URCC 34. After his personal struggles during his time away from the sport, he earned an emotional victory via unanimous decision.

Championships and achievements
Ultimate Fighting Championship
Fight of the Night (Five times) vs. Frankie Edgar, Clay Guida, Thiago Tavares, Sean Sherk, Rafael dos Anjos 
Fight of the Year (2007) vs. Clay Guida 
Submission of the Night (One time) vs. David Lee 
Gladiator Challenge
GC Featherweight Championship (One time)

Mixed martial arts record

|-
| Win
| align=center| 17–8
| Jordan Bailey
| Decision (unanimous)
| URCC 34
| 
| align=center| 3
| align=center| 5:00
| Richmond, California, United States
|
|-
| Loss
| align=center| 16–8
| Luiz Firmino
| Decision (unanimous)
| WSOF 10
| 
| align=center| 3
| align=center| 5:00
| Las Vegas, Nevada, United States
| 
|-
| Loss
| align=center| 16–7
| Gesias Cavalcante
| TKO (punches)
| WSOF 4
| 
| align=center| 3
| align=center| 1:37
| Ontario, California, United States
| 
|-
| Win
| align=center| 16–6
| Efrain Escudero
| Decision (unanimous)
| RFA 4: Griffin vs. Escudero
| 
| align=center| 3
| align=center| 5:00
| Las Vegas, Nevada, United States
| 
|-
| Loss
| align=center| 15–6
| Bart Palaszewski
| KO (punches)
| UFC 137
| 
| align=center| 1
| align=center| 2:45 
| Las Vegas, Nevada, United States
| 
|-
| Win
| align=center| 15–5
| Manvel Gamburyan
| Decision (majority)
| UFC Live: Kongo vs. Barry
| 
| align=center| 3
| align=center| 5:00
| Pittsburgh, Pennsylvania, United States
| 
|-
| Loss
| align=center| 14–5
| Nik Lentz
| Decision (split)
| UFC 123
| 
| align=center| 3
| align=center| 5:00
| Auburn Hills, Michigan, United States
| 
|-
| Loss
| align=center| 14–4
| Takanori Gomi
| KO (punch)
| UFC Live: Jones vs. Matyushenko
| 
| align=center| 1
| align=center| 1:04
| San Diego, California, United States
| 
|-
| Loss
| align=center| 14–3
| Evan Dunham
| Decision (split)
| UFC 115
| 
| align=center| 3
| align=center| 5:00
| Vancouver, British Columbia, Canada
| 
|-
| Win
| align=center| 14–2
| Hermes França
| KO (punches)
| UFC 103
| 
| align=center| 2
| align=center| 3:26
| Dallas, Texas, United States
| 
|-
| Win
| align=center| 13–2
| Rafael dos Anjos
| Decision (unanimous)
| UFC Fight Night: Condit vs. Kampmann
| 
| align=center| 3
| align=center| 5:00
| Nashville, Tennessee, United States
| 
|-
| Loss
| align=center| 12–2
| Sean Sherk
| Decision (unanimous)
| UFC 90
| 
| align=center| 3
| align=center| 5:00
| Rosemont, Illinois, United States
| 
|-
| Win
| align=center| 12–1
| Marcus Aurélio
| Decision (unanimous)
| UFC 86
| 
| align=center| 3
| align=center| 5:00
| Las Vegas, Nevada, United States
| 
|-
| Win
| align=center| 11–1
| Gleison Tibau
| Decision (unanimous)
| UFC 81
| 
| align=center| 3
| align=center| 5:00
| Las Vegas, Nevada, United States
| 
|-
| Win
| align=center| 10–1
| Thiago Tavares
| Decision (unanimous)
| UFC 76
| 
| align=center| 3
| align=center| 5:00
| Anaheim, California, United States
| 
|-
| Win
| align=center| 9–1
| Clay Guida
| Decision (split)
| UFC 72
| 
| align=center| 3
| align=center| 5:00
| Belfast, Northern Ireland
| 
|-
| Loss
| align=center| 8–1
| Frankie Edgar
| Decision (unanimous)
| UFC 67
| 
| align=center| 3
| align=center| 5:00
| Las Vegas, Nevada, United States
| 
|-
| Win
| align=center| 8–0
| David Lee
| Submission (rear-naked choke)
| UFC 63
| 
| align=center| 1
| align=center| 1:50
| Anaheim, California, United States
| 
|-
| Win
| align=center| 7–0
| Duane Ludwig
| TKO (punches)
| Strikeforce: Revenge
| 
| align=center| 1
| align=center| 3:57
| San Jose, California, United States
| 
|-
| Win
| align=center| 6–0
| Chuck Kim
| Submission (rear-naked choke)
| GC 49: Face Off
| 
| align=center| 1
| align=center| 3:34
| Lakeport, California, United States
| 
|-
| Win
| align=center| 5–0
| Melchor Manibusan
| TKO (punches)
| FFCF 5: Unleashed
| 
| align=center| 1
| align=center| 4:05
| Mangilao, Guam
| 
|-
| Win
| align=center| 4–0
| Jorge Evangelista
| KO (punches)
| GC 46: Avalanche
| 
| align=center| 1
| align=center| 3:14
| Coarsegold, California, United States
| 
|-
| Win
| align=center| 3–0
| Urijah Faber
| TKO (punches)
| GC 42: Summer Slam
| 
| align=center| 3
| align=center| 0:05
| Lakeport, California, United States
| 
|-
| Win
| align=center| 2–0
| Cody Williams
| Submission (rear-naked choke)
| GC 36: Proving Grounds
| 
| align=center| 1
| align=center| 2:05
| Porterville, California, United States
| 
|-
| Win
| align=center| 1–0
| Ryan Frost
| TKO (punches)
| GC 32: King of the Hill
| 
| align=center| 1
| align=center| 1:16
| Colusa, California, United States
|

References

External links

Homepage of Tyson Griffin
Official Tyson Griffin Tee KO Page

1984 births
Living people
American male mixed martial artists
Mixed martial artists from California
Lightweight mixed martial artists
Featherweight mixed martial artists
Mixed martial artists utilizing Brazilian jiu-jitsu
American practitioners of Brazilian jiu-jitsu
Sportspeople from Sacramento, California
Santa Rosa Junior College alumni
Ultimate Fighting Championship male fighters